Seminole Hot Springs is an unincorporated community in Los Angeles County, California, United States.

References

Unincorporated communities in Los Angeles County, California
Populated places in the Santa Monica Mountains
Unincorporated communities in California